Istomino is a rural locality (a selo) in Kabansky District, Republic of Buryatia, Russia. The population was 277 as of 2010. There are 8 streets.

Geography 
Istomino is located 34 km northwest of Kabansk (the district's administrative centre) by road. Stepnoy Dvorets is the nearest rural locality.

References 

Rural localities in Kabansky District
Populated places on Lake Baikal